is a railway station on the Tobu Skytree Line in Adachi, Tokyo, Japan, operated by the private railway operator Tobu Railway.

Lines
Gotanno Station is served by the Tobu Skytree Line, and lies 9.3 km from the line's Tokyo terminus at Asakusa. It is numbered "TS-11".

Station layout

The station has one island platform serving two tracks, with additional tracks on either side for non-stop trains.

Adjacent stations

History
Gotanno Station opened on 1 October 1924.

From 17 March 2012, station numbering was introduced on all Tobu lines, with Gotanno Station becoming "TS-11".

References

External links

 Tobu station information  

Railway stations in Tokyo
Railway stations in Japan opened in 1924